Goss Meadows is a   Local Nature Reserve  on the north-western outskirts of Leicester. It is owned and managed by Leicester City Council.

This is a long narrow strip along the western side of Anstey Lane. It is woodland and grassland, which has some uncommon wild flowers, such as spiny restharrow.

There is access from Anstey Lane.

References

Local Nature Reserves in Leicestershire